Manisha Sinha is an Indian-born American historian, and the Draper Chair in American History at the University of Connecticut. She is the author of The Slave's Cause: A History of Abolition (2016), which won the Frederick Douglass Book Prize.

Early life 

Her father was Srinivas Kumar Sinha, an Indian Army general. She received her PhD from Columbia University where her dissertation was nominated for the Bancroft Prize.

Career 
Sinha's research focuses on early United States history, especially the transnational histories of slavery and abolition and the history of the Civil War and Reconstruction. Sinha is the author of The Counterrevolution of Slavery: Politics and Ideology in Antebellum South Carolina (2000), which was named one of the ten best books on slavery in Politico in 2015. 
Sinha is also a contributing author of The Abolitionist Imagination (Harvard University Press, 2012), and co-editor of African American Mosaic: A Documentary History from the African Slave Trade to the Twenty First Century (Prentice Hall, 2004) and Contested Democracy: Freedom, Race and Power in American History (Columbia University Press, 2007).

She was awarded the Chancellor's Medal, the highest honor bestowed on faculty, and received the Distinguished Graduate Mentor Award in Recognition of Outstanding Graduate Teaching and Advising at the University of Massachusetts, Amherst, where she taught for over twenty years. She was elected member of the American Antiquarian Society, and was appointed to the Organization of American Historians' Distinguished Lecture Series.

Sinha has received two year-long research fellowships from the National Endowment for the Humanities, fellowships from the Charles Warren Center and the W.E.B. Du Bois Institute at Harvard University, the Howard Foundation fellowship at Brown University, and the Rockefeller Post-Doctoral fellowship from the Institute of the Arts and Humanities at the University of North Carolina, Chapel Hill.

She is a member of the Council of Advisors for the Lapidus Center for the Historical Analysis of Transatlantic Slavery at the Schomburg Center,  New York Public Library, co-editor of the "Race and the Atlantic World, 1700–1900", series of the University of Georgia Press, and is on the editorial board of the Journal of the Civil War Era.

Works 
  The Counterrevolution of Slavery: Politics and Ideology in Antebellum South Carolina, University of North Carolina Press, 2000. , 
 The Slave's Cause: A History of Abolition New Haven: Yale University Press, 2016. ,

References

External links
 https://historynewsnetwork.org/article/168091

Year of birth missing (living people)
Columbia University alumni
University of Connecticut faculty
21st-century American historians
University of Massachusetts Amherst faculty
Indian emigrants to the United States
Living people
Place of birth missing (living people)
American women historians
21st-century American women
20th-century American historians
20th-century American women writers
American women writers of Indian descent
Historians of slavery